Anya Oko Anya (born 3 January, 1937) is a Nigerian professor of Biology who is distinguished for his work in Parasitology.

Early life 

Anya Oko Anya was born on 3 January 1937 at Abiriba, Abia State of Nigeria.
He attended Hope Waddell Training Institution, Calabar, University College, Ibadan, Saint John's College, Cambridge, England  and Molteno Institute of Biology and Parasitology.

He began his working career as a Science Master with Qua-Iboe Mission Secondary School, Etinan, Akwa Ibom State in 1957.
He was appointed Research Officer, Federal Fisheries Research Service, Lagos, 1961–1962; Lecturer, Federal Science School, Lagos, 1961–1962; Research Officer, Federal Department of Agricultural Research, Ibadan, 1963–1967; Lecturer in Zoology, University of Nigeria, Nsukka, 1965–1967; Senior Lecturer, University of Science and Technology Project, Port Harcourt, 1967–1970; Senior Lecturer, University of Nigeria, Nsukka, 1970–1973; Professor of Zoology, University of Nigeria, Nsukka since 1973 and he was the former Chief Executive Officer, Nigeria Economic Summit Group Ltd.

Awards
Anya was awarded the Nigerian National Medal of Merit by the Nigerian government in 1992.

References 

1937 births
Nigerian parasitologists
Fellows of the Nigerian Academy of Science
Academic staff of the University of Nigeria
Living people